Manurewa-Papakura Ward is an Auckland Council ward which elects two councillors and covers the Manurewa and Papakura Local Boards. The two councillors are currently Angela Dalton and Daniel Newman.

Demographics

Manurewa-Papakura ward had a population of 153,303 at the 2018 New Zealand census, an increase of 25,428 people (19.9%) since the 2013 census, and an increase of 34,551 people (29.1%) since the 2006 census. There were 40,611 households, comprising 76,443 males and 76,860 females, giving a sex ratio of 0.99 males per female. The median age was 30.4 years (compared with 37.4 years nationally), with 38,322 people (25.0%) aged under 15 years, 37,137 (24.2%) aged 15 to 29, 63,807 (41.6%) aged 30 to 64, and 14,037 (9.2%) aged 65 or older.

Ethnicities were 36.7% European/Pākehā, 26.3% Māori, 29.0% Pacific peoples, 24.7% Asian, and 2.7% other ethnicities. People may identify with more than one ethnicity.

The percentage of people born overseas was 34.0, compared with 27.1% nationally.

Although some people chose not to answer the census's question about religious affiliation, 32.6% had no religion, 42.4% were Christian, 2.7% had Māori religious beliefs, 6.9% were Hindu, 2.2% were Muslim, 1.5% were Buddhist and 5.9% had other religions.

Of those at least 15 years old, 18,300 (15.9%) people had a bachelor's or higher degree, and 23,361 (20.3%) people had no formal qualifications. The median income was $29,300, compared with $31,800 nationally. 14,049 people (12.2%) earned over $70,000 compared to 17.2% nationally. The employment status of those at least 15 was that 59,469 (51.7%) people were employed full-time, 12,525 (10.9%) were part-time, and 6,690 (5.8%) were unemployed.

Councillors

Election Results 
Election Results for the Manurewa-Papakura Ward:

2022 Election Results

References

Wards of the Auckland Region